Ulu Anyut is the sub-area of Ulu Paku, Spaoh, Betong District, Betong Division, Sarawak, Malaysia. It is primarily an Iban area with a few small longhouses. Ulu Anyut areas consists of the longhouses:

Lingit
Sungai Rian (Occupants originally from Udau)
Udau
Blabak Jitu
Blabak Nanam
Engkrebai
Lempaong

Ulu Anyut gets its name from the Anyut River flowing through this area.

Betong District
Populated places in Sarawak